Carlo Campogalliani (10 October 1885 – 10 August 1974) was an Italian screenwriter, actor and film director. Campogalliani directed around eighty films during his career and acted in another fifty. He directed the 1934 sports film Stadio. He was married to the actress Letizia Quaranta who appeared in several of his films.

Selected directorial filmography

 The Woman at Midnight (1925)
 I Lost My Heart on a Bus (1929)
 Courtyard (1931)
 The Devil's Lantern (1931)
 The Doctor in Spite of Himself (1931)
 Stadium (1934) 
 The Four Musketeers (1936)
 The Night of Tricks (1939)
 The Cavalier from Kruja (1940)
 The Hero of Venice (1941)
 Forbidden Music (1942)
 The Innocent Casimiro (1945)
 The Devil's Gondola (1946)
 Hand of Death (1949)
 The Beggar's Daughter (1950)
 Beauties on Bicycles (1951)
 Beauties on Motor Scooters (1952)
 Orphan of the Ghetto (1954)
 The Song of the Heart (1955)
 The Angel of the Alps (1957)
 Captain Falcon (1958)
 Goliath and the Barbarians (1959)
 Fountain of Trevi (1960)
 Ursus (1961)
 Sword of the Conqueror  (1961) 
 The Avenger of Venice (1964)

References

Bibliography 
 Reich, Jacqueline & Garofalo, Piero. Re-viewing Fascism: Italian Cinema, 1922-1943. Indiana University Press, 2002.

External links 
 

1885 births
1974 deaths
Film people from the Province of Modena
20th-century Italian screenwriters
Italian film directors
Italian male film actors
20th-century Italian male actors
Italian male screenwriters
20th-century Italian male writers